Guglielmo Marconi (S 521) was a of the Italian Navy.

Construction and career
Guglielmo Marconi was laid down at Fincantieri Monfalcone Shipyard on 1 July 1976 and launched on 20 October 1979. She was commissioned on 6 November 1982.

She was decommissioned on 30 June 2010. She is currently moored at Quay Sauro Calata San Vito, pier 2, north side in the La Spezia Naval Base.

Gallery

Citations

External links
 

1980 ships
Sauro-class submarines
Ships built by Fincantieri
Guglielmo Marconi